Erin Richards is a Welsh actress, director and writer, best known for playing Molly Hughes in the television series Breaking In and Barbara Kean in the television series Gotham.

Life and career 

Richards was born in Penarth, Wales. She trained at the Royal Welsh College of Music and Drama. She presented the Welsh language teen magazine show Mosgito for S4C and appeared in short films before landing significant roles in BBC TV programmes Crash and Being Human.

In 2012, she was cast in the FOX comedy Breaking In as an executive assistant with an exaggerated English accent. She became a Breaking In regular in January 2012.

She co-starred in the role of Sharon in Gonzalo López-Gallego's horror film Open Grave, alongside Sharlto Copley.

From 2014 to 2019, she played Barbara Kean in the FOX Television series Gotham. She directed the fifth season episode "The Trial of Jim Gordon", which premiered on 7 March 2019.

According to FOX, she is starring in an unreleased independent film called That Good Night alongside Max Brown and John Hurt. She also appeared in The Quiet Ones, Open Grave, and in television, Being Human in the UK. She lives in London, Los Angeles, and New York.

Filmography

Film

Television

Director

References

External links 
 
 
 
 

Living people
People from Penarth
Welsh film actresses
Welsh-speaking actors
Welsh television actresses
Welsh television directors
Welsh stage actresses
Alumni of the Royal Welsh College of Music & Drama
British women television directors
1986 births
21st-century Welsh actresses